Albert Roy Dick (28 October 1900 – 27 June 1971) was an Australian rules footballer who played with Carlton in the Victorian Football League (VFL).

Notes

External links 

Roy Dick's profile at Blueseum

1900 births
Carlton Football Club players
Tatura Football Club players
Australian rules footballers from Victoria (Australia)
1971 deaths